James Carter Walker Jr. (born June 25, 1947) is an American actor and comedian. Walker portrayed James Evans Jr. ("J.J."), the older son of Florida and James Evans Sr., on the CBS television series Good Times, which ran from 1974 to 1979, and was nominated for a Golden Globe Award in 1975 and 1976 for his role. While on the show, Walker's character used the catchphrase "Dyn-O-Mite!" which he also used in his mid–1970s TV commercial for a Panasonic line of cassette and 8-track tape players and a 2021 and 2022 Medicare commercial. He also starred in Let's Do It Again with John Amos, and The Greatest Thing That Almost Happened with James Earl Jones. Walker continues to tour the country with his stand-up comedy routine.

Early life
Walker was born in Brooklyn, New York and raised in The Bronx, New York. He attended Theodore Roosevelt High School in New York City. Through a New York State funded program known as SEEK (Search for Education, Evaluation, and Knowledge), he continued his studies and entered into the field of radio engineering with WRVR. As a young man, Walker was a vendor at Yankee Stadium, starting with the 1964 World Series.

Career
In 1967, Walker began working full-time with WRVR, the radio station of the Riverside Church. In 1969, Walker began performing as a stand-up comedian and was eventually discovered by the casting director for Good Times, after making appearances on Rowan & Martin's Laugh In and on the Jack Paar Show. He eventually released one stand-up comedy album during the height of his Good Times popularity: Dyn-o-mite on Buddah Records (5635). During Good Times' 1974–75 season, Walker was 26 years old, though his character was much younger. John Amos, the actor who portrayed Walker's father on Good Times, was actually just eight years older than Walker.

Walker credits producer/director John Rich for inventing "Dyn-o-mite!" which Rich insisted Walker say on every episode. Both Walker and executive producer Norman Lear were skeptical of the idea, but the phrase and Walker's character caught on with the audience.

Off- and on-camera, Walker did not get along with the series' lead, Esther Rolle, because she and Amos disapproved of Walker's increasingly buffoonish character and his popularity, and Walker felt hurt by their disdain. Dissatisfaction led Amos (before Rolle), to leave the show, making Walker the star of the show. Walker was the only Good Times star to not attend Rolle's funeral.

Later career
During 1975 Walker was also a weekend personality on contemporary R&B music station KAGB 103.9 FM licensed to Inglewood in the Los Angeles market.

Walker appeared on The Tonight Show and Match Game during the 1970s and early 1980s. He was a five-time panelist on the Match Game-Hollywood Squares Hour from 1983 to 1984. He also appeared on the 1990 revival of Match Game and various game shows during that era.

Walker has made guest appearances on Badge 373, The Love Boat, Fantasy Island, The Larry Sanders Show, Son of the Beach, The Drew Carey Show, The John Larroquette Show, In the House, Cagney & Lacey, The Fall Guy, Scrubs, Star Dates, Everybody Hates Chris, George Lopez, Chelsea Lately and Lincoln Heights. He also appeared in the films Rabbit Test (1978), The Concorde ... Airport '79 (1979), Airplane! (1980), Water (1985), Doin' Time (1985), The Guyver (1991), Monster Mash (1995) and Plump Fiction (1997).

Aside from guest appearances, he starred in the short-lived television series At Ease in 1983 and Bustin' Loose in 1987.

In the 1990s, Walker returned to his radio roots hosting shows on WHIO, WOAI, WLS, and KKAR. In 1996, he appeared on split release with Powerviolence band Spazz distributed by Spazz owned label Slap-a-ham records.

In 2010, Walker made a cameo appearance in the movie Big Money Rustlas. In 2011, he appeared in a Syfy channel movie Super Shark.

In 2012, Walker's autobiography, Dyn-o-mite! Good Times, Bad Times, Our Times – A Memoir, was published. In 2012, Walker announced the release of his official app developed by Monty Goulet for iOS.

Personal life and political views
According to an appearance on The Wendy Williams Show on June 27, 2012, Walker stated he has never been married nor fathered children, but has had many girlfriends. Walker appeared on The O'Reilly Factor on July 11, 2012. He stated that he did not vote for Barack Obama in 2008 and that he would not vote for him in the 2012 election either. In an interview with CNN, Walker described himself politically as a "realist independent" and stated that he opposed affirmative action, saying that it had outlived its usefulness. He also said that he was against gay marriage on moral grounds, but believed its legalization should be passed, stating it was not worth fighting against.

Walker described his political beliefs at length in his autobiography, Dyn-O-Mite: Good Times, Bad Times, Our Times: A Memoir. In it, he called himself a "logicist," who believes in "logic and common sense", holding conservative positions on many issues.

Filmography

Film

Television

Video Game

See also
 Black conservatism in the United States

References

External links

Jimmie Walker interview  with Nardwuar
Interview with Nardwuar in mp3

1947 births
African-American male comedians
American male comedians
African-American male actors
American male film actors
American male television actors
American stand-up comedians
Living people
Male actors from New York City
New York (state) Republicans
People from the Bronx
Comedians from New York City
20th-century American comedians
21st-century American comedians
20th-century African-American people
21st-century African-American people
Black conservatism in the United States